Irbid National University (abbreviated INU) is a university in Jordan. Established in 1994, it is located in the northern town of Irbid. It has a student body of 6,000.

Irbid National University is a private university, certified by the Ministry of Higher Education and Scientific Research of Jordan, the Islamic Association of Arab Universities (AARU), (FUW), and the Federation and European universities (UNIMED). The university President is Prof. Mohammed Said Subbarini.

Scientific Research Deanship 
The deanship performs scientific research through the Scientific Research Committee, whose task is to supervise and support scientific research and its publishing.

The deanship is also responsible for publishing Irbid Journal for Research and Studies (a-referred journal) in the field of humanities. Articles are published after being approved by specialized referees. The deanship staff publishes the staff's research papers.

The deanship also holds lectures, seminars and conferences that develop the research skills of the teaching staff.

The Academics Appropriations 
 Memorandum of Academic understanding with the University of the Near East in Turkey
 Memorandum of Academic understanding with the Fayoum University in Egypt.
 Memorandum of Academic understanding with the Oman College of Management and Technology in Oman.

Students Deanship

Department of Student Activities 
The section is a part of the Deanship of Student Affairs. It implements sports, artistic, and cultural activities so that students can practice their hobbies.

University Drawing Hall 
The university has established a studio on the campus to provide a space for artistic talent and its development. The studio hosts exhibitions by artists from all artistic trends. It gives students the opportunity to participate in internal and external art competitions.

To motivate the studio members, the university holds an annual gathering ceremony in honor of the active, creative participants, in addition to those participating in other extracurricular activities.

Music 
Activities include:
 singing, 
 acting on stage, 
 folk arts and folk songs, 
 Dabka (a folk collective dance), 
 developing the students' artistic sense, 
 forming teams of choral singers, individual singers, music players, theater actors, and folklore performers,  
 training students to play musical instruments.

Sports activities 
Students participate in sport activities organized by the Sports Federation of Jordanian Universities.

Faculties

Faculty of Sharia Law
 Department of Law
 Master of law

Faculty of Business Administration and Finance 
 Accounting
 Finance and banking
 Business management
 Tourism management and hospitality
 Marketing
 Management information system
 Accounting information system

Faculty of Arts and the Arts 
 Arabic Language and Literature
 English Language and Literature
 Translation
 Graphic design

Faculty of Science and Technology Information 
 Computer science
 Computer information systems
 Mathematics
 Master of Mathematics

Faculty of Nursing 
 Department of Nursing

Faculty of Educational Sciences 
 Classroom teacher
 Special education
 Psychological counseling and educational

Faculty of Engineering 
 Civil Engineering and Constructions

Facilities 
Arab Club for Arab Students was established in order to care for Arab students who study at the university. The club organizes tours for them to identify archaeological and tourist sites of Jordan and inform them of the attractions and other activities.
The Gym was established in 2007, and contains a gym, and facilities for football, basketball, volleyball, and tennis, and rooms for bodybuilding, squash, billiards, table tennis, and bowling.
Outside Stadiums was founded in 2000, and includes a football field, surrounded by four halls to accommodate 5000 people, in addition to the basketball court.
Cafeterias providing food and drink for the students, with stores of consumer goods.
Musical center Activities is the activity performed in the field of music, singing, Choir Irbid National University, and the Task Jordanian folklore, and the field of theater acting, and stage directions, and in the field of folk arts and folk singing Dabke.
The University Studio Activities

INU Centers 
 Center of Development, Accreditation and Quality Assurance 
 Preparing studies that concern the development of the university,
 Considering the national accreditation standards, and working on improving the administrative performance of the university,
 Preparing plans and programs aiming at developing the quality of the academic performance at the university,
 Following up the requirement for accreditation of the faculties and academic departments.
 Center  of Communication, Consultation  and Continuing Education  The center was established in 2001. Its role is to provide expertise, scientific, and technical support to the public and private institutions. The center is considered as the link between the university and the local community.
 Computer Center  is a technical office in the university . It forms the information window to the university.
 Health Care Center located inside the campus, provides health services for the students.

References 

, Private Jordanian universities

External links
Irbid National University website

Private universities and colleges
Educational institutions established in 1994
1994 establishments in Jordan
Irbid